The Gas Council Engineering Research Station was a former engineering research institute on Tyneside, situated in a distinctively-shaped and listed building, now occupied by the Metropolitan Borough of North Tyneside.

History

Design
It was designed by Ryder & Yates in 1965, who also designed the Television Centre, Newcastle upon Tyne. Ryder and Yates had formed in 1953 in Newcastle. It was built under the former Northumberland County Council. The Northern Gas Board had its main headquarters in Killingworth. It was first announced in November 1965. It was built in anticipation of North Sea gas. Killingworth was a north-east new town, known as Killingworth Township. It was planned to open in the summer of 1968. It was built on the site of Killingworth Colliery. The modernist architecture is developed from Le Corbusier and Berthold Lubetkin.

Construction
It was built from 1966-67 on a 10-acre site. An extension was added from 1975-76 to contain a restaurant.

It was Grade II listed on 27 January 1997 by English Heritage (Historic England since 2015).

Structure
It is situated directly between the B1505 to east and the East Coast Main Line (ECML) to the west, in the west of Killingworth. Nearby to the south was the former distinctively-designed headquarters, Norgas House, of the Northern Gas Board, also designed by Ryder & Yates, until North Tyneside agreed its demolition in 2012.

Block A housed the Engineering Research Station and Block B housed the School of Engineering.

Function
It housed the main research function of British Gas, where the National Transmission System (NTS) was designed. The research centre's first function was to design the pipeline system around the UK. It researched metallurgy and pipelines, and avoiding any cracks in the UK's pipelines.

British Gas left the site in 1995 and North Tyneside Council moved in. In 2008, North Tyneside moved most of its functions to Cobalt Park on the A19.

See also
 Grade II* listed buildings in Tyne and Wear

References

External links
 100 Places NE
 RIBA
 Roof
 Something Concrete and Modern

1967 establishments in the United Kingdom
Buildings and structures in the Metropolitan Borough of North Tyneside
Education in the Metropolitan Borough of North Tyneside
Engineering education in the United Kingdom
Energy research institutes
Grade II listed buildings in Tyne and Wear
Grade II listed industrial buildings
History of the Metropolitan Borough of North Tyneside
Natural gas infrastructure in the United Kingdom
Research institutes established in 1967
Research institutes in Tyne and Wear